Kolbuszowa  is a small town in south-eastern Poland, with 9,190 inhabitants (02.06.2009). 
Situated in the Sandomierz Forest in the Subcarpathian Voivodship (since 1999), it is the capital of Kolbuszowa County. Kolbuszowa belongs to historic Lesser Poland, near its border with another historic region, Red Ruthenia.

History
The name of the town comes from the land owner Kolbusz. It appeared for the first time in 1503 in place where Poręby Wielkie used to exist. The town, which belonged to Sandomierz Voivodeship, was probably founded before 1683, when it was mentioned in a trade regulating document of Józef Karol Lubomirski. Kolbuszowa was located on an important trade route from Sandomierz to Przemyśl. As the owners of the area were the Leliwa Tarnowski, Kolbuszowa belonged to Sandomierz County.  With regard to the Roman Catholic Church, Kolbuszowa was within the diocese of Kraków, but in 1786 it was moved under the jurisdiction of the diocese of Tarnów.

During the partitions of Poland the town was in the Rzeszów district of the Austrian Galicia and in 1867 it became the seat of its own county (powiat). Before World War II, half of Kolbuszowa's population was Jewish. The coat of arms of the city features a Christian cross and a Star of David with hands shaking between them to symbolize the friendship between Jewish and Christian Poles in Kolbuszowa.

During the war, German troops burned down part of the town and about half of the Jewish population perished. In September 1941 Germans established a ghetto and interned 2500 people. In September 1942 the ghetto was emptied and its entire population was moved to a ghetto in Rzeszów.

On September 9, 1939, a 2-day battle  between the Polish Army (121st light tank company) and the German 2nd Panzer Division took place here.  During the war units of Polish Armia Krajowa (AK) and BCh (Polish Peasants' Battalions) operating in this area discovered testing sites for the German V-1 and V-2 rockets in the nearby towns of Blizna/Pustkow. The Red Army entered Kolubuszowa in July 1944 and local Polish AK units (as part of Operation Tempest) attacked retreating German units; several dozen partisans died in the operation.

After World War II, Kolbuszowa was rebuilt. New school districts were created, as well as a library and Museum of Culture. In 1964, a new rail link was established: Rzeszów – Głogów Małopolski – Kolbuszowa. In 1971, it was extended to Nowa Dęba and Tarnobrzeg. This connected Kolbuszowa to all the major cities in Poland including the capital, Warsaw.  It was a culmination of decades of preparations which started when this part of Poland was under the control of the Austro-Hungarian Empire.

Notable people
 Jan Bytnar, Scoutmaster, Polish Scouting resistance activist and Second Lieutenant of Armia Krajowa.
 Marian Krzaklewski, Polish politician, was born in Kolbuszowa.
 Hadassah (née Bluth) and Eliezer Birnbaum (parents of American comedian/actor George Burns).

International relations

Twin towns — Sister cities
Kolbuszowa is twinned with:

Gallery

References
Notes

Cities and towns in Podkarpackie Voivodeship
Kolbuszowa County
Sandomierz Voivodeship
Kingdom of Galicia and Lodomeria
Lwów Voivodeship
Holocaust locations in Poland
Jewish communities destroyed in the Holocaust

it:Kolbuszowa